The 2013–14 Appalachian State Mountaineers men's basketball team represented Appalachian State University during the 2013–14 NCAA Division I men's basketball season. The Mountaineers, led by fourth year head coach Jason Capel, played their home games at the George M. Holmes Convocation Center and were members of the Southern Conference. They finished the season 9–21, 5–11 in SoCon play to finish in ninth place. They lost in the first round of the SoCon tournament to Samford.

At the end of the season, head coach Jason Capel was fired after a four-year record of 53–70.

This was the Mountaineers' last season as a member of the SoCon, as they joined the Sun Belt Conference in July 2014.

Roster

Schedule

|-
!colspan=9 style="background:#000000; color:#FFCF00;"| Regular season

|-
!colspan=9 style="background:#000000; color:#FFCF00;"| 2014 SoCon tournament

References
http://www.appstatesports.com/SportSelect.dbml?&DB_OEM_ID=21500&SPID=12824&SPSID=104520

Appalachian State Mountaineers men's basketball seasons
Appalachian State
Appalachian State
Appalachian State